Sinner's Parade is a 1928 American silent crime film directed by John G. Adolfi and starring Victor Varconi, Dorothy Revier, and John Patrick. It is not known whether this film survives.

The film's sets were designed by the art director Harrison Wiley.

Cast
 Victor Varconi as Al Morton  
 Dorothy Revier as Mary Tracy  
 John Patrick as Bill Adams  
 Edna Marion as Connie Adams  
 Marjorie Bonner as Sadie 
 Clarissa Selwynne as Mrs. Adams  
 Jack Mower as Chauffeur

References

Bibliography
 Larry Langman & Daniel Finn. A Guide to American Silent Crime Films. Greenwood Press, 1994.

External links

1928 films
1928 crime films
American crime films
Films directed by John G. Adolfi
American silent feature films
Columbia Pictures films
American black-and-white films
1920s English-language films
1920s American films